Microsoft Automatic Graph Layout (MSAGL) is a .NET library for automatic graph layout.
It was created by Lev Nachmanson at Microsoft Research. 

Earlier versions carried the name GLEE (Graph Layout Execution Engine).

Contents 
The MSAGL software supplies three programming libraries:

 , a device-independent graph layout engine;
 , a device-independent implementation of graphs as graphical user interface objects, with all kinds of graphical attributes, and support for interface events such as mouse actions;
 , a Windows.Forms-based graph viewer control.
 , a WPF (Windows Presentation Foundation) based graph viewer control.

A trivial application is supplied to demonstrate the viewer.

Features 
MSAGL performs layout based on principles of the Sugiyama scheme; it produces so called layered, or hierarchical, layouts (according to the MSAGL home page). Modified Coffman–Graham scheduling algorithm is then used to find a layout that would fit in a given space.

At some time, it did not support a wide range of different layout algorithms, unlike, for instance, GraphViz or GUESS.

It does not appear to support incremental layout.

Availability and licensing 
MSAGL is distributed under MIT License as open source at GitHub.

See also 

 graph layout
 Graph algorithms
 Graphviz, an open-source graph drawing system from AT&T

References

External links 
 MSAGL home page
 MSAGL in a browser
 US Patent 7932907

Graph drawing software
Free and open-source software
Microsoft free software
Microsoft Research
Programming tools for Windows
Software using the MIT license
Windows-only free software